Kendra Haylock Haylock (born 5 December 1999) is a Honduran footballer who plays as a right midfielder for FC Motagua and the Honduras women's national team.

Club career
Haylock has played for Motagua in Honduras.

International career
Haylock made her senior debut for Honduras on 19 November 2021. She also capped during the 2022 CONCACAF W Championship qualification.

International goals
Scores and results list Saint Vincent and the Grenadines goal tally first

References

1999 births
Living people
Honduran women's footballers
Women's association football midfielders
F.C. Motagua players
Honduras women's international footballers